Dengue vaccine is a vaccine used to prevent dengue fever in humans. Development of dengue vaccines began in the 1920s, but was hindered by the need to create immunity against all four dengue serotypes.

As of 2022, there are two commercially available vaccine and sold under the brand name Dengvaxia and Qdenga. Dengvaxia is only recommended in those who have previously had dengue fever or populations in which most people have been previously infected. The value of Dengavaxia is limited by the fact that it may increase the risk of severe dengue in those who have not previously been infected. In 2017, more than 733,000 children and more than 50,000 adult volunteers were vaccinated with CYD-TDV regardless of serostatus, which led to a controversy. Qdenga is designated for people not previously infected.

There are other vaccine candidates in development including live attenuated, inactivated, DNA and subunit vaccines.

History
In December 2018, Dengvaxia was approved in the European Union.

In May 2019, Dengvaxia was approved in the United States as the first vaccine approved for the prevention of dengue disease caused by all dengue virus serotypes (1, 2, 3 and 4) in people ages nine through 16 who have laboratory-confirmed previous dengue infection and who live in endemic areas. Dengue is endemic in the U.S. territories of American Samoa, Guam, Puerto Rico and the U.S. Virgin Islands.

The safety and effectiveness of the vaccine was determined in three randomized, placebo-controlled studies involving approximately 35,000 individuals in dengue-endemic areas, including Puerto Rico, Latin America and the Asia Pacific region. The vaccine was determined to be approximately 76 percent effective in preventing symptomatic, laboratory-confirmed dengue disease in individuals 9 through 16 years of age who previously had laboratory-confirmed dengue disease. Dengvaxia has been approved in 19 countries and the European Union.

Dengvaxia is not approved in the U.S. for use in individuals not previously infected by any dengue virus serotype or for whom this information is unknown.

Dengvaxia is a live, attenuated vaccine that is administered as three separate injections, with the initial dose followed by two additional shots given six and twelve months later.The U.S. Food and Drug Administration (FDA) granted the application for Dengvaxia priority review designation and a tropical disease priority review voucher. The approval of Dengvaxia was granted to Sanofi Pasteur.

In March 2021, the European Medicines Agency the filing package for TAK-003 intended for markets outside of the EU. Qdenga was approved in the European Union in December 2022.

In August 2022, the Indonesian FDA approved Qdenga for use in individuals six years to 45 years of age and become the first authority in the world to approve Qdenga.

CYD-TDV (Dengvaxia) 
CYD-TDV, sold under the brand name Dengvaxia and made by Sanofi Pasteur, is a live attenuated tetravalent chimeric vaccine made using recombinant DNA technology by replacing the PrM (pre-membrane) and E (envelope) structural genes of the yellow fever attenuated 17D strain vaccine with those from the four dengue serotypes. Evidence indicates that CYD-TDV is partially effective in preventing infection, but may lead to a higher risk of severe disease in those who have not been previously infected and then do go on to contract the disease. It is not clear why the vaccinated seronegative population have more serious adverse outcomes. A plausible hypothesis is the phenomenon of antibody-dependent enhancement (ADE). American virologist Scott Halstead was one of the first researchers to identify the ADE phenomenon. Dr. Halstead and his colleague Dr. Phillip Russell proposed that the vaccine only be used after antibody testing, to rule out prior dengue exposure and avoid vaccination of sero-negative individuals.

Common side effects include headache, pain at the site of injection, and general muscle pains. Severe side effects may include anaphylaxis. Use is not recommended in people with poor immune function. Safety of use during pregnancy is unclear. Dengvaxia is a weakened but live vaccine and works by triggering an immune response against four types of dengue virus.

Dengvaxia became commercially available in 2016 in 11 countries: Mexico, the Philippines, Indonesia, Brazil, El Salvador, Costa Rica, Paraguay, Guatemala, Peru, Thailand, and Singapore. In 2019 it was approved for medical use in the United States. It is on the World Health Organization's List of Essential Medicines.

In 2017, the manufacturer recommended that the vaccine only be used in people who have previously had a dengue infection, as outcomes may be worsened in those who have not been previously infected. This led to a controversy in the Philippines where more than 733,000 children and more than 50,000 adult volunteers were vaccinated regardless of serostatus.

The World Health Organization (WHO) recommends that countries should consider vaccination with the dengue vaccine CYD-TDV only if the risk of severe dengue in seronegative individuals can be minimized either through pre-vaccination screening or recent documentation of high seroprevalence rates in the area (at least 80% by age nine years).

The WHO updated its recommendations regarding the use of Dengvaxia in 2018, based on long-term safety data stratified by serostatus on 29 November 2017. Seronegative vaccine recipients have an excess risk of severe dengue compared to unvaccinated seronegative individuals. For every 13 hospitalizations prevented in seropositive vaccinees, there would be 1 excess hospitalization in seronegative vaccinees per 1,000 vaccinees. WHO recommends serological testing for past dengue infection 

In 2017, the manufacturer recommended that the vaccine only be used in people who have previously had a dengue infection as otherwise there was evidence it may worsen subsequent infections. The initial protocol did not require baseline blood samples prior to vaccination in order to establish an understanding of increased risk of severe dengue in participants who had not been previously exposed. In November 2017, Sanofi acknowledged that some participants were put at risk of severe dengue if they had no prior exposure to the infection; subsequently the Philippine government suspended the mass immunization program with the backing of the WHO which began a review of the safety data.

Phase III trials in Latin America and Asia involved over 31,000 children between the ages of two and 14 years. In the first reports from the trials, vaccine efficacy was 56.5% in the Asian study and 64.7% in the Latin American study in patients who received at least one injection of the vaccine. Efficacy varied by serotype. In both trials vaccine reduced by about 80% the number of severe dengue cases. An analysis of both the Latin American and Asian studies at the 3rd year of follow-up showed that the efficacy of the vaccine was 65.6% in preventing hospitalization in children older than nine years of age, but considerably greater (81.9%) for children who were seropositive (indicating previous dengue infection) at baseline. The vaccination series consists of three injections at 0, 6 and 12 months.
The vaccine was approved in Mexico, the Philippines, and Brazil in December 2015, and in El Salvador, Costa Rica, Paraguay, Guatemala, Peru, Indonesia, Thailand, and Singapore in 2016. Under the brand name Dengvaxia, it is approved for use for those aged nine years of age and older and can prevent all four serotypes.

TAK-003 (Qdenga) 
TAK-003 or DENVax, sold under the brand name Qdenga and made by Takeda, is a recombinant chimeric attenuated vaccine with DENV1, DENV3, and DENV4 components on a dengue virus type 2 (DENV2) backbone originally developed at Mahidol University in Bangkok and now funded by Inviragen (DENVax) and (TAK-003). Phase I and II trials were conducted in the United States, Colombia, Puerto Rico, Singapore and Thailand.
Based on the 18-month data published in the journal Lancet Infectious Diseases, indicated that TAK-003 produced sustained antibody responses against all four virus strains, regardless of previous dengue exposure and dosing schedule.

Data from the phase III trial, which began in September 2016, show that TAK-003 was efficacious against symptomatic dengue. TAK-003 appears to not lack efficacy in seronegative people or potentially cause them harm, unlike CYD-TDV. The data appear to show only moderate efficacy in other dengue serotypes than DENV2.

In development

TV-003/005

TV-003/005 is a tetravalent admixture of monovalent vaccines, that was developed by NIAID, that were tested separately for safety and immunogenicity. The vaccine passed phase I trials and phase II studies in the US, Thailand, Bangladesh, India, and Brazil.

NIH has conducted phase I and phase II studies in over 1000 participants in the US. It has also conducted Human challenge studies while having conducted NHP model studies successfully.

NIH has licensed their technology for further development and commercial scale manufacturing to Panacea Biotec, Serum Institute of India, Instituto Butantan, Vabiotech, Merck, and Medigen.

In Brazil, phase III studies are being conducted by Instituto Butantan in-collaboration with NIH. Panacea Biotec has conducted phase II clinical studies in India.

A company in Vietnam (Vabiotech) is conducting safety tests and developing a clinical trial plan. All four companies are involved in studies of a TetraVax-DV vaccine in conjunction with the US National Institutes of Health.

TDENV PIV

TDENV PIV (tetravalent dengue virus purified inactivated vaccine) is undergoing phase I trials as part of a collaboration between GlaxoSmithKline (GSK) and the Walter Reed Army Institute of Research (WRAIR). A synergistic formulation with another live attenuated candidate vaccine (prime-boost strategy) is also being evaluated in a phase II study. In prime-boosting, one type of vaccine is followed by a boost with another type in an attempt to improve immunogenicity.

V180

Merck is studying recombinant subunit vaccines expressed in Drosophila cells. , it has completed phase I stage and V180 formulations found to be generally well tolerated.

DNA vaccines

In 2011, the Naval Medical Research Center attempted to develop a monovalent DNA plasmid vaccine, but early results showed it to be only moderately immunogenic.

Society and culture

Legal status 
On 13 October 2022, the Committee for Medicinal Products for Human Use (CHMP) of the European Medicines Agency (EMA) adopted a positive opinion, recommending the granting of a marketing authorization for the medicinal product Qdenga, intended for prophylaxis against dengue disease. The applicant for this medicinal product is Takeda GmbH. The active substance of Qdenga is dengue tetravalent vaccine (live, attenuated), a viral vaccine containing live attenuated dengue viruses which replicate locally and elicit humoral and cellular immune responses against the four dengue virus serotypes. Qdenga was approved for medical use in the European Union in December 2022.

In February 2023, Qdenga was approved by the UK Medicines and Healthcare products Regulatory Agency (MHRA) for people aged four years and older.

Economics

Controversies

Philippines 
The 2017 dengue vaccine controversy in the Philippines involved a vaccination program run by the Philippines Department of Health (DOH). The DOH vaccinated schoolchildren with Sanofi Pasteur's CYD-TDV (Dengvaxia) dengue vaccine. Some of the children who received the vaccine had never been infected by the dengue virus before. The program was stopped when Sanofi Pasteur advised the government that the vaccine could put previously uninfected people at a somewhat higher risk of a severe case of dengue fever. A political controversy erupted over whether the program was run with sufficient care and who should be held responsible for the alleged harm to the vaccinated children.

References

External links
 
 
 

Dengue fever
Vaccines
World Health Organization essential medicines (vaccines)
Wikipedia medicine articles ready to translate